The 2010–11 season was the Manitoba Junior Hockey League's (MJHL) 94th season of operation. 

The Portage Terriers posted the best record in the regular season and won their seventh Turnbull Cup.  The Terriers advanced as far as the 2011 Royal Bank Cup, but did not qualify for the national semi-finals.

Season highlights
Three teams relocate to new arenas:
The Winnipeg Saints move to the St. Adolphe Arena for one season.
The Winnipeg South Blues move to the MTS Iceplex and change name to the Winnipeg Blues.
The Portage Terriers move to the newly-constructed 1,975-seat Portage Credit Union Centre in Portage la Prairie.
The Waywayseecappo Wolverines crossover to qualify for the Addison Division semi-finals.
The league holds its annual showcase event October 8-10 at the MTS Iceplex.
2011 NHL Entry Draft: Portage Terriers goaltender Jason Kasdorf is selected 157th overall by the Winnipeg Jets.

Standings

Playoffs

Post MJHL playoffs
Anavet Cup
Portage Terriers defeat La Ronge Ice Wolves 4-games-to-3
Royal Bank Cup
Terriers finish fifth in the round robin and are eliminated from playoffs.

League awards
 Steve "Boomer" Hawrysh Award (MVP): Shane Luke, Dauphin
 MJHL Top Goaltender Award: Matthew Krahn, OCN
 Brian Kozak Award (Top Defenceman): Clark Bzczynski, Swan Valley
 Vince Leah Trophy (Rookie of the Year): Bryn Chyzyk, Dauphin
 Lorne Lyndon Memorial Trophy (Hockey Ability and Sportsmanship): Shane Luke, Dauphin
 Muzz McPherson Award (Coach of the Year): Scott McMillan, OCN
 Mike Ridley Trophy (Scoring Champion): Shane Luke, Dauphin
 MJHL Playoff MVP: Tyler Moore, Portage

CJHL awards
 CJAHL Player of the Year (MJHL): Shane Luke, Dauphin

References

External links
 MJHL Website
 2010-11 MJHL season at HockeyDB.com

Manitoba Junior Hockey League seasons
MJHL